Ōsaka 19th district (大阪府第19区, Ōsaka-fu dai-jūkyū-ku or simply 大阪19区, Ōsaka-jūkyū-ku) is a single-member electoral district for the House of Representatives, the lower house of the national Diet of Japan. It is located in southern Osaka and consists of the cities of Kaizuka, Izumisano, Sennan, Hannan and the towns of Kumatori, Tajiri and Misaki in the former county of Sennan. As of September 2012, 307,237 eligible voters were registered in the district.

Before the electoral reform of the 1990s, the area had formed part of the five-member Osaka 5th district.

Between 2012 and 2021 the Representative from the district was Hodaka Maruyama. Initially a member of the Japan Restoration Party but later its successor party Ishin. In 2019, Maruyama was ejected from Ishin for comments he made under the influence of alcohol during a visit to the Kuril Islands and he joined the single-issue Anti-NHK party. Nobuhisa Itō, former Representative of the Osaka 11th district gained the seat back for Ishin in 2021.

List of representatives

Election results 

 
 
 
 
 
  

 
 
 
 
  
  

Note: The decimal votes (anbunhyō, "proportional fractional votes") stem from the fact that in this case the given names Takashi and Yutaka are the reading of the same Chinese character 豊, and some voters apparently voted for 豊 without specifying a family name.

References 

Politics of Osaka Prefecture
Districts of the House of Representatives (Japan)